This is a summary of the electoral history of Mohammad Khatami, an Iranian Reformist politician who has been previously President of Iran (1997–2005) and member of Islamic Consultative Assembly (1980–1982) from Ardakan.

Parliament election

1980 

In the election he was placed first in Ardakan, receiving 32,942 out of 40,112 (82.1%) votes.

Ministry approval 
Khatami was nominated and approved for Ministry of Culture and Islamic Guidance by Iranian Parliament on consecutive times.

Presidential elections

1997 

According to Nohen et al, Khatami won with 20,078,187 votes (69.07%).   reported that Khatami won with 20,138,784 votes (69.1%).

2001 

According to Sahliyeh and RFE/RL, Khatami won with 21,656,476 votes (76.90%).

References 

Mohammad Khatami
Electoral history of Iranian politicians